The Tobwaan Kiribati Party (TKP) is a political party in Kiribati.

History
The party was established in January 2016 as a merger of the Maurin Kiribati Party and the United Coalition Party. The two parties had won 19 of the 45 elected seats in the House of Assembly in the 2015–16 parliamentary elections, with party member Teatao Teannaki subsequently elected to the Assembly as Speaker of the House of Assembly. It nominated Taneti Mamau as its candidate for the 2016 presidential elections, which Mamau won with around 60% of the vote.

In November 2019, after the switch of diplomatic relations from Taiwan to China, its chairman Banuera Berina founded an opposition party, the Kiribati Moa Party, with 13 MPs. Tekeeua Tarati became party chairman in May 2020, but was succeeded by Betero Atanibora three months later.

References

External links

Political parties in Kiribati
Political parties established in 2016
2016 establishments in Kiribati